Mikk Pinnonen (born 4 January 1991) is an Estonian handballer who plays as a playmaker for Știința Municipal Dedeman Bacău in the Romanian Liga Naţională and the Estonian national team.

National team career
Pinnonen's first international match was a 31–22 defeat against Macedonia on 27 November 2008 at the Boris Trajkovski Sports Center in front of 4,000 Macedonian fans. In that match, he scored 4 goals for Estonia aged 17 years.

Achievements
Danish Handball Cup:
Winner: 2013

References

1991 births
Living people
People from Antsla Parish
Estonian male handball players
Expatriate handball players
Estonian expatriate sportspeople in Denmark
Estonian expatriate sportspeople in Sweden
Estonian expatriate sportspeople in Romania